Going to Extremes and Surviving Extremes were television programmes made for Channel 4 by Nick Middleton.  In each episode of the two series, Middleton visited an extreme area of the world to find out how people have adapted to life there.

Both Going to Extremes and Surviving Extremes were accompanied by books of the same name, except in the USA where the latter was titled Extremes: Surviving the World's Harshest Environments.

There was also a third series, titled Going to Extremes: The Silk Routes.

Going to Extremes
In this series, Middleton visited the coldest, hottest, driest and wettest permanent settlements in the world.
Coldest
Oymyakon in Siberia, where the average winter temperature is −47 °F (− 44 °C).

Driest
Arica in Chile, where there had been fourteen consecutive years without rain. Fog is the only local source of water.

Wettest
Mawsynram in India, where average annual rainfall is 14 meters, falling within a four-month period in the monsoon season. The rainfall is approximately equal to that of its neighbor Cherrapunji. 

Hottest
Dallol in Ethiopia, known as the 'Hell-hole of creation' where the temperature averages 94 °F (34 °C) over the year.

Surviving Extremes
In his second series, Middleton visited places without permanent towns, locations where "survival requires a lifestyle completely in tune with Nature's rhythms."

Sand - Niger Middleton travelled with a group of women across the Sahara in extreme heat to trade date palms.

Ice - Greenland Middleton travelled with the indigenous people of northern Greenland, where four fifths of the land is permanently ice-covered.

Jungle - Democratic Republic of Congo Middleton visited the dangerous jungle in Congo.

Swamp - Papua Middleton examined how people live with very little solid land.

Toxic - Kazakhstan Middleton visited an abandoned Soviet biological weapons testing site with a toxic environment.

References

Further reading
Middleton, Nick Going to Extremes: Mud, Sweat and Frozen Tears.
 Channel 4 books, 2001, hardcover, 
 Pan Books - Macmillan UK, 2003, paperback,  .
Middleton, Nick Extremes : Surviving the World's Harshest Environments .
 Thomas Dunne Books, 2005, hardcover, .
Middleton, Nick Surviving Extremes.
 Macmillan, paperback, 2004, .

Channel 4 original programming